The Haarlems Dagblad is a regional newspaper in Haarlem, Netherlands. It makes claim to being the newspaper with the oldest publishing history in the world, even if this claim is based on its (forced) merger with another title.

Oprechte Haerlemsche Courant
This earlier publication was published by Abraham Casteleyn and his wife Margaretha van Bancken, beginning in 1656 under the title Weeckelycke Courante van Europa ("Weekly Newspaper of Europe"). In 1664, when the authorities took steps to protect the weekly from its imitators, it became known as De Oprechte Haerlemse Courant (spellings vary; "oprecht" is here used in its archaic sense of "genuine"). After her husband's death in 1681, Margaretha received permission to carry on the activities of the firm.

The weekly (which soon began appearing twice and subsequently three times a week, and in the nineteenth century became a monthly) thus preceded English regular newspapers. In the paper's early days, the Windsor coffee house used to advertise that, apart from offering "the best chocolate", it supplied  translations of "the Harlem Courant soon after the post is come in".

During the German occupation of the Netherlands in the Second World War, the Opregte Haarlemsche Courant was forced to merge with Haarlems Dagblad; hence the latter paper's claim to being the oldest title extant. The merged newspaper is owned by Mediahuis, a Belgian newspaper conglomerate.

References

External links 
 Weeckelijcke Courante, Dutch-language information about the original title with facsimile versions of the first front page, the first back page and the advertisement
 Advertisements in the Oprechte Haerlemsche Courant from the start up to 1675

Daily newspapers published in the Netherlands
Dutch-language newspapers
Mass media in Haarlem
Joh. Enschedé
1656 establishments in the Dutch Republic
Publications established in the 1650s